Stenomelania aspirans is a species of freshwater snail, an aquatic gastropod mollusc in the family Thiaridae.

Stenomelania aspirans is the type species of the genus Stenomelania.

References

External links
 

Thiaridae
Gastropods described in 1844
Freshwater molluscs of Oceania
Taxobox binomials not recognized by IUCN